Li Yingjie is a Chinese Paralympic athlete. In 2016, she won the bronze medal in the women's 800 metres T54 event at the 2016 Summer Paralympics held in Rio de Janeiro, Brazil. She also won the bronze medal in the women's 100 metres T54 event.

References 

Living people
Year of birth missing (living people)
Place of birth missing (living people)
Paralympic athletes of China
Paralympic gold medalists for China
Paralympic bronze medalists for China
Athletes (track and field) at the 2016 Summer Paralympics
Medalists at the 2016 Summer Paralympics
Paralympic medalists in athletics (track and field)
21st-century Chinese women